Josef Henri Charles Christiaens, sometimes spelt Joseph (16 June 1882 – 25 February 1919), was a Belgian engineer, racecar driver and aviator.

Biography

Christiaens was born in Saint-Josse-ten-Noode on 16 June 1882  to a prosperous Belgian family. On 13 August 1905 he participated in the Coupe de Liedekerke et Williame race held near Dinant, Belgium. The race spanned 102.740 km, but Josef failed to complete the race. He also failed to qualify for the Il Coupe de Normandie with his Vivinus 6 racecar on 29 August 1909. The Vivinus later gave Christiaens his first victory, winning the 2nd Coupe de Liedekerke et Williame in Ostend, Belgium on 13 September 1909. He went on to take a string of victories in Europe and in the US.

On 9 September 1916 Josef and his  English Sunbeam racecar, became the first foreigner to enter the Indianapolis Motor Speedway "Harvest Classic", composing of three races held at 20, 50 and 100- distances. Johnny Aitken, in a Peugeot, came in first in all 3 distances. Josef's Sunbeam failed to start the race due to a broken crankshaft.

When Henri Farman flew the Voisin-designed biplane and took Ernest Archdeacon for a 1241-metre flight at Ghent, Belgium on 30 May 1908, he was immediately captivated and inspired by the spirit of flying.

In March 1910 Josef met Géo Chavez at Camp de Châlons, France and learnt to fly on a Farman plane from him.  By 12 April in the same year, he is registered with licence N°7, becoming one of the first 11 pilots registered at the Aéro-Club de Belgique (Aero Club of Belgium).

On 14 March 1911, Josef received much enthusiasm and assistance from the British Colonial Government in Singapore. a squad of Royal Engineers soldiers were dispatched to assemble and test the Bristol Boxkite. On 16 March 1911 Josef made history in Singapore as the first man to fly an aeroplane on the island.

Josef died in a road accident while performing a test drive on a Sunbeam racecar near Moorfield Works on 25 February 1919 in Wolverhampton, Staffordshire, England. Shortly after leaving the Works, his car crashed into a wall along Upper Villiers Street trying to avoid a horse-cart coming out of Fowler Street.

Indy 500 results

References

1882 births
1919 deaths
Aviation pioneers
Belgian aviators
20th-century Belgian engineers
Belgian racing drivers
Indianapolis 500 drivers
Racing drivers who died while racing
Sport deaths in England